Gohar Markosjan-Käsper (14 July 1949, Yerevan – 15 September 2015, Barcelona) was an Armenian writer who lived in Tallinn, Estonia.

Biography
Her father was an opera singer and her mother, a ballet-dancer. She graduated from Yerevan State Medical University and married Kalle Käsper, an Estonian writer and translator, in 1990. Before moving to Estonia, Gohar Markosjan worked as a doctor in Yerevan.

Markosjan-Käsper's best-known work is probably the novel Penelope (translated into French, German - as Penelope, die Listenreiche, Dutch and Spanish) . Her novels Helena and The Caryatides have also been successful in Russia and Western Europe. Her works have been characterized as magical realist.

She wrote in Russian. Markosjan-Käsper was also a member of the Estonian Writers' Union.

Bibliography
Penelope (1998)
Helena (2000)
The Caryatides (2003)
Penelope Starts the Journey (2007)
Mycenae, Rich in Gold (2009)
Memento mori (2012)

References and notes

External links
http://www.dradio.de/dlf/sendungen/buechermarkt/165476/ 
https://web.archive.org/web/20070927000502/http://www.ekspress.ee/viewdoc/C8F1B66C2D6F2D10C225701300316B0C 
Игорь Котюх Прозрачные слова Гоар Маркосян-Кяспер. Postimees 
 https://web.archive.org/web/20180329214316/http://markosjan-kasper.com/ 

1949 births
2015 deaths
Writers from Yerevan
20th-century Armenian writers
Armenian women novelists
Soviet writers
Estonian people of Armenian descent
20th-century Estonian novelists
21st-century Estonian novelists
Russian-language writers
20th-century Armenian women writers